Travele Andrew Jones (born November 9, 1988) is an American professional basketball player. He was an All-American college player for Texas Southern University.

College career
Jones came to Texas Southern after two seasons at Cerritos College, a junior college in California.  After averaging 13.7 points and 5.8 rebounds per game as a junior in 2009–10, Jones raised his game in his final season.  He led the Tigers to a Southwestern Athletic Conference (SWAC) regular season championship, averaging 16 points and 6.9 rebounds per game.  At the conclusion of the season, Jones was named the SWAC Player of the Year and an honorable mention All-American by the Associated Press.

Professional career
After going undrafted in the 2011 NBA draft, Jones signed with SAM Basket Massagno of Switzerland for the 2011–12 season. He went on to average 16.8 points, 7.3 rebounds, 1.8 assists and 2.2 steals in 26 games for Massagno.

On October 4, 2012, Jones signed with Verviers-Pepinster of Belgium for the 2012–13 season. Later that month, he left Verviers-Pepinster after just two games.

In the summer of 2013, Jones signed with the Sendai 89ers of Japan for the 2013–14 season. He went on to average 15.8 points, 8.8 rebounds, 2.1 assists and 1.5 steals in 48 games for Sendai. On August 29, 2014, he agreed to terms with the Aomori Watts, but later left the team and returned to the United States before appearing in a game for them.

On November 2, 2014, Jones was acquired by the Bakersfield Jam of the NBA Development League. He was later waived by the Jam before the start of the season.

On February 10, 2016, he signed with Arkadikos. He went on to average 2.2 points, 1.8 rebounds, 0.4 assists and 0.3 steals in 9 games for Arkadikos.

References

External links
 Eurobasket.com Profile
 

1988 births
Living people
American expatriate basketball people in Belgium
American expatriate basketball people in Greece
American expatriate basketball people in Japan
American expatriate basketball people in Switzerland
American expatriate basketball people in Uruguay
American expatriate basketball people in Vietnam
American men's basketball players
Arkadikos B.C. players
Basketball players from California
Cerritos Falcons men's basketball players
Club Atlético Welcome basketball players
Power forwards (basketball)
RBC Pepinster players
Saigon Heat players
SAM Basket players
Sendai 89ers players
Texas Southern Tigers men's basketball players
Sportspeople from Los Angeles County, California
Inglewood High School (California) alumni